Carbon is a 2017 Hindi science fiction short film on global warming, written and directed by Maitrey Bajpai and Ramiz Ilham Khan. The film stars Jackky Bhagnani, Nawazuddin Siddiqui and Prachi Desai. The film is set in 2067, in an Earth where carbon is the gas in abundance, and oxygen is supplied by industries. Bhagnani plays a man with an artificial heart and Siddiqui plays the role of a man from Mars and Desai plays a robot. The film was released on the YouTube channel of Large Short Films.

Plot
Set in 2067, 'Carbon' focuses on the prevailing environmental issues in Delhi. The film showcases scarcity of oxygen and water and its adverse effects on the environment and the forthcoming generations. This futuristic film portrays a scenario where there will be a dearth of oxygen and only carbon will prevail.

Cast 
 Jackky Bhagnani as Random Shukla
 Prachi Desai as Pari
 Yashpal Sharma as Yakub 
 Nawazuddin Siddiqui as a contract killer based in Mars (imposter Mr. Shah)
 Shashi Bhushan as Shashi

Reception
After releasing film's trailer, it has created a very good buzz among the audience and the industry.

When the film released it got positive responses for the concept from the critics. Actor Sushant Singh Rajput praises the film by saying, "Generally, we talk about cause after the effect has taken place, but there are very few instances where we talk about effect before cause. 'Carbon' is a very well-intentioned film and a required film at this point of time. It talks about an immediate issue, so I want to congratulate Jackky for that. I have seen the trailer and I really liked it. I feel the concept of the film is really good, and puts a question mark on the whole system." Hindustan Times said, "The short film plays up the current socio-political equations and sets them in a world almost 50 years from now. The divide between rich and poor, human greed and spiralling environmental crisis are all well-placed in the narrative." The Indian Express give a mixed review by saying, "...Meanwhile, Nawazuddin, a contract killer, poses as an NRI from Mars. The plot may sound interesting, but sadly the unrelatable characters and dull dialogue delivery play spoilsport. Even if the first 15 minutes are bearable and support the plotline, it still is a failed attempt."
In the film director show people needed 100% pure oxygen but they didn't know pure oxygen is generally bad, and sometimes toxic.

References

External links
 

2017 films
2017 science fiction films
2017 short films
Indian short films
Indian science fiction films
2010s dystopian films
Indian post-apocalyptic films
Films set in 2067
Films set in Delhi
Films released on YouTube